John Nickles (born 1964, Washington DC) is an elite American Triathlete and endurance athlete. Among his accomplishments, he won the World Champion Title in the 1999 Hawaii Ultraman World Championship . In 1994 he set an Ultra Marathon Cycling Association world record  when he traversed the Blue Ridge Parkway from Cherokee, NC to Rockfish Gap, VA (470 miles) by bike in 31:30 hours. In 1993 he was a member of the second place team in the Race Across America, which finished the 3000 mile race in 6 days 6 hours.

John is a 1986 graduate of Cornell University and received a master's degree (1988) from Oxford University (Brasenose College) where he was a Full Blue member of the athletics team.

American male triathletes
Cornell University alumni
Alumni of Brasenose College, Oxford
1964 births
Living people